Type 349 radar is a fire-control radar for Type 730 CIWS developed by the 20th Research Institute of China Electronics Technology Group Corporation (CETGC, 中国电子科技集团公司第二十研究所), also known as Xi’an Research Institute of Navigation Technology (西安导航技术研究所), with the Chinese naval designation of H/LJP-349. In addition to CIWS, Some models of Type 349 is also used to control larger caliber guns.

Type 349 radar is frequently but erroneously referred by many as either Type 347 or Type 348, because externally, all three radars look very similar, and all three are developed as fire control radar for small caliber guns. In reality, the three radars are different and they can be easily distinguished by the following features: When electro-optics (EO) are integrated with radar, EO is installed on the portside of Type 347 radar antenna, but for Type 348 and Type 349, EO is installed on the starboard side of the radar antenna. Furthermore, when incorporated as part of CIWS, Type 349 is slaved to Type 730 CIWS gun and thus does not rotate, because the gun rotates when searching/tracking. In contrast, Type 348 is not slaved to the Type 76 37mm twin guns, but instead, installed separately from the gun mounts, and thus Type 348 rotates when searching/tracking. The shape of antenna is also an important visual cue to distinguish three radars. The tip of Type 349 radar is a conical, which is missing on Type 347. Instead, the tip of Type 347 radar antenna is a small circular flat surface, missing the tip of the cone. The antenna of Type 348 radar differs from both Type 347 and Type 349 radars in that most of the cone is missing, only the base remains, so the antenna of Type 348 radar has a very large circular flat surface, resulting in Type 348 radar resembles a scaled down version of another larger fire control radar for larger caliber guns (76 mm or greater), Type 344.

Several models of Type 349 radars have been deployed by PLAN, with the first and most widely used version as the one installed on Type 730 CIWS. Another model used to control larger caliber guns is installed separately from the gun mount and rotates when searching/tracking. A derivative LR66 can control both the small and larger caliber guns.

See also
Chinese radars
Naval Weaponry of the People's Liberation Army Navy

References

Sea radars
Military radars of the People's Republic of China